William Arnold Shanklin (April 18, 1862 – October 6, 1924) was a Methodist minister and an American university president.

Early life
William Arnold Shanklin, a member of the prominent Shanklin Family, was born at Carrollton, Missouri on April 18, 1862.  He was the son of Wesley Dunscombe Shanklin and Lockie Ann (née Arnold) Shanklin.  His younger brother, Arnold Shanklin, served as consul general of the United States at Panama beginning in 1905.

Shanklin was educated at public schools in Missouri before attending Hamilton College (A.B., 1883) and at Garrett Biblical Institute (S.T.B., 1891).

Career
Before entering the ministry, Shanklin spent four years "engaged in mercantile pursuits" in Chetopa, Kansas.  After graduating from Garrett Biblical Institute in 1891, Shanklin was ordained to the Methodist Episcopal ministry and held pastorates in Kansas, in Spokane and Seattle, in Washington, in Dubuque, Iowa, and in Reading, Pennsylvania.

In 1905, he was elected president of Upper Iowa University, which was founded in 1857, and served as president from 1905 until 1909. In 1908, he was elected to succeed Bradford P. Raymond as the ninth president of Wesleyan University in Middletown, Connecticut beginning in June 1909.  He received many honorary degrees, including a D.D. from the University of Washington in 1895, and an LL.D. from Baker University in 1906.

Personal life
On October 13, 1891, Shanklin was married to Emma Elizabeth Brant (1869–1947), the daughter of Jefferson Emery Brant and Mary Ann (née McAllister) Brant, at Fort Scott, Kansas. Together, they were the parents of three children:

 Mary Arnold Shanklin
 William Arnold Shanklin Jr.
 Anna Shanklin

Shanklin died in New York City on October 6, 1924.  He was buried at Rose Hill Cemetery in Bloomington, Indiana.

References

External links

Presidents of Wesleyan University
1862 births
1924 deaths
People from Carrollton, Missouri
Hamilton College (New York) alumni
Garrett–Evangelical Theological Seminary alumni
19th-century Methodist ministers
20th-century Methodist ministers
American Methodist clergy
Burials in Indiana
20th-century American clergy
19th-century American clergy